Marcel Schuhen (born 13 January 1993) is a German professional footballer who plays as a goalkeeper for SV Darmstadt 98.

References

External links
 
 

Living people
1993 births
People from Kirchen
German footballers
Association football goalkeepers
1. FC Köln II players
FC Hansa Rostock players
SV Sandhausen players
SV Darmstadt 98 players
3. Liga players
2. Bundesliga players
Footballers from Rhineland-Palatinate